The greater big-footed mouse or long-tailed big-footed mouse (Macrotarsomys ingens) is a nocturnal rodent found only in north west Madagascar. It was first described by F. Petter in 1959. It is listed as an endangered species as a result of habitat loss.

Description
Its big feet are adapted for climbing among the branches of trees. The pelage is brownish-fawn with a greyish undercoat; the underparts and legs are creamy white.

Distribution and habitat
The greater big-footed mouse is found only in Mahajanga Province in north-western Madagascar, in the Ankarafantsika forest which is now part of the Ankarafantsika National Park. This is a low rainfall area with typical dry tropical vegetation. The mouse is a nocturnal species. It spends the day in a burrow in the forest floor, the entrance of which is concealed under a rock or tree root and spends the night scrambling about in bushes and trees looking for food.

Biology
The greater big-footed mouse is believed to be herbivorous and probably eats berries, fruit, nuts, seeds, roots, and stems. It probably falls prey to such predators as snakes, birds and carnivorous mammals.

Status
The greater big-footed mouse is listed as "Endangered" in the IUCN Red List of Threatened Species. Its habitat is subject to degradation by fire and logging and the mouse is at risk of predation by feral animals.

References

Macrotarsomys
Mammals described in 1959
Taxa named by Francis Petter
EDGE species
Mammals of Madagascar